Ras el Oued is a commune in Taounate Province of the Taza-Al Hoceima-Taounate administrative region, Fès-Meknès, Morocco. At the time of the 2004 census, the commune had a total population of 15949 people living in 2438 households.

References

Populated places in Taounate Province
Rural communes of Fès-Meknès